is a Japanese manufacturer of sake based in Obara, a settlement in the present borders of Kasama, and one of the original settlements of Ibaraki Prefecture. Founded in 1141 and run by the 55th generation of the Sudo family, it is the oldest sake brewery in Japan and one of the oldest companies in the world.

Although it was undamaged by the 2011 Tōhoku earthquake and tsunami, the brewery was threatened by the subsequent nuclear disaster at the Fukushima I Nuclear Power Plant, located approximately 130 km from the brewery. Subsequent tests confirmed no radiation had entered its hundreds-of-years-old source wells.

References

Drink companies of Japan
Companies established in the 12th century
Organizations established in the 1140s
Companies based in Ibaraki Prefecture
Rice wine
Sake
1140s establishments in Japan
Japanese brands
Companies established in the 9th century